Ionion FM, simply Ionion is a Greek radio station broadcasting at 95.5 MHz, serving the western portion of Greece. The station is a mixture of variety and Top 40. The station is named with the Ionian Sea, on its slogans, it reads ...not the sea, the radio station (Ionion, ohi ton pelagos...) One of the jingles, featured Fred Flintstone (from The Flintstones) in the original voice and said Yabba Dabba Doo, leave a message, I'll get back to you. The station is full of informative news and commentary. In the period of 2002 up to 2010, it was rebroadcasting with Skai 100.3. From 2010 until today, rebroadcasts with Real FM 97.8 of Athens.

External links
Ionion FM Website
Ionion FM Live Streaming

Radio stations in Greece